ICSA Women's Dinghy National Championship is one of the seven Inter-Collegiate Sailing Association National Championships. 

Winners are awarded the Gerald C. Miller Trophy. Second place team receives the Nancy Kleckner Trophy and third place team receives the Ann Campbell Trophy.

Champions

References

External links 
GERALD C. MILLER TROPHY

ICSA championships
Women's sailing competitions